Johnie Scot is Child ballad number 99.

Synopsis
Johnie Scot served the king of England and got his daughter pregnant.  The king threw her in prison to starve.  One day, back in Scotland, he sent a shirt to his love, and she sent back a letter with the news.  He raised a force and came to her rescue. This is a Child ballad.

Variants
This ballad closely parallels Child ballad 100, Willie o Winsbury.

References

Child Ballads
Year of song unknown